Cizer is a commune located in Sălaj County, Crișana, Romania. It is composed of three villages: Cizer, Plesca (Palicka) and Pria (Perje).

Geography

Cizer is nestled within the Meseș Mountains (a mountain range within the Apuseni Mountains).

The commune lies on the banks of the river Crasna; its affluent, the Pria, discharges into the Crasna in the village of Plesca.

Sights 
 Museum in Cizer (rustic old house), built in the 18th century, historic monument.
 Orthodox Church in Pria, built in the 20th century (1930–1936).

References

Communes in Sălaj County
Localities in Crișana